Fältjägarnas IF is a Swedish football club located in Östersund.

Background
Fältjägarnas IF currently plays in Division 4 Jämtland/Härjedalen which is the sixth tier of Swedish football. They play their home matches at the Jägarvallen in Östersund.

The club is affiliated to Jämtland-Härjedalens Fotbollförbund.

Season to season

Footnotes

External links
 Fältjägarnas IF – Official website
 Fältjägarnas IF on Facebook

Football clubs in Jämtland County
1909 establishments in Sweden